Origins (2011–2016) is the seventh studio album written and conducted by French electronic record producer Uppermost. It was released on February 10, 2017 through his independent record label Uppwind. The album is also classed as Uppermost's debut compilation album as it includes released and unreleased titles between the years 2011 and 2016. The album includes his debut breakthrough "Flashback", as well as non-album singles "Beautiful Light", "Mistakes" and "Reminder".

The album's lead single, entitled "Hope", was released in August 2016 as the follow up single ending his Impact EP era. It was shortly succeeded by his second single, entitled "Stay in Love", featuring vocals from singer/songwriter Ofelia. The album's next single, entitled "Constellation", was released on 9 December 2016 as the album's first promotional single.

A remix EP, Origins (2011 - 2016) (The Remixes), was released on June 16, 2017.

Track listing

Notes
  signifies an original producer
 Track 3 "Beautiful Light" samples Michael Jackson & Paul McCartney - "Say Say Say" / Daft Punk - "Face to Face / Birdy - "People Help the People" / Muse - "Madness"
 Tracks 7, 12, 15, 17, 20 and 21 were released previously from Uppermost's album, entitled Revolution (2013).
 Tracks 1, 2, 5, 9, 11, 14, 18, 22 and 23 are newly recorded songs.
 Tracks 3 and 8 were released previously from Uppermost's album, entitled Control (2012).
 Tracks 10 and 13 were released previously from Uppermost's album, entitled Evolution (2014).
 Track 6 was released previously from Uppermost's album, entitled One (2012).
 Track 16 was released previously from Uppermost's album, entitled Action (2011).

References

2017 albums
Albums produced by Thomas Bangalter
Albums produced by Guy-Manuel de Homem-Christo
Albums produced by George Martin